The 1989 Newsweek Champions Cup and the 1989 Virginia Slims of Indian Wells were tennis tournaments played on outdoor hard courts. It was the 16th edition of the Indian Wells Masters and was part of the 1989 Nabisco Grand Prix and of the Category 4 tier of the 1989 WTA Tour. Both the men's and women's events took place at the Grand Champions Resort in Indian Wells, California, in the United States. The men's tournament was played from March 13 through March 20, 1989, while the women's tournament was played from March 6 through March 12, 1989.

Finala

Men's singles

 Miloslav Mečíř defeated  Yannick Noah 3–6, 2–6, 6–1, 6–2, 6–3
 It was Mečíř's 2nd title of the year and the 20th of his career.

Women's singles

 Manuela Maleeva defeated  Jenny Byrne 6–4, 6–1
 It was Maleeva's 1st title of the year and the 13th of her career.

Men's doubles

 Boris Becker /  Jakob Hlasek defeated  Kevin Curren /  David Pate 7–6, 7–5
 It was Becker's 3rd title of the year and the 30th of his career. It was Hlasek's 2nd title of the year and the 8th of his career.

Women's doubles

 Hana Mandlíková /  Pam Shriver defeated  Rosalyn Fairbank /  Gretchen Magers 6–3, 6–7(4–7), 6–3
 It was Mandlíková's 1st title of the year and the 29th of her career. It was Shriver's 5th title of the year and the 121st of her career.

References

External links
 
 ATP tournament profile
 WTA Tournament Profile
 ITF tournament edition details

 
1989 Newsweek Champions Cup and the Virginia Slims of Indian Wells
Newsweek Champions Cup and the Virginia Slims of Indian Wells
Virginia Slims of Indian Wells
Newsweek Champions Cup and the Virginia Slims of Indian Wells
Newsweek Champions Cup and the Virginia Slims of Indian Wells
Newsweek Champions Cup and the Virginia Slims of Indian Wells